"" is the national anthem of Qatar, written by al-Shaykh Mubārak bin Sayf al-Thānī and composed by ʿAbdulʿazīz Nāṣṣir al-ʿUbaydān al-Fakhrū.

This was also the title of the Kuwaiti national anthem from 1951 to 1978.

History and use
The anthem was adopted on 7 December 1996 upon the accession of Shaykh Ḥamad bin Khalīfa al-Thānī to the throne. It was first used at a Gulf Cooperation Council meeting held in Qatar in December of that year.

In 2015, Shaykh Mubārak bin Sayf al-Thānī presented the first written draft of the anthem to the Qatar National Museum, where it will be put on display.

Lyrics

Notes

References

External links

Ministry of Foreign Affairs - The Qatari Ministry of Foreign Affairs' page on the National Anthem.
 Qatar: As Salam al Amiri - Audio of the national anthem of Qatar, with information and lyrics (archive link)
15th Asian Games (archive link) - Qatar National Anthem played at the 15th Asian Games Closing Ceremonies. Hosted by YouTube.

Asian anthems
National symbols of Qatar
Qatari music
Royal anthems
National anthem compositions in B-flat major
Arabic-language songs